Tukojirao III  (1 January 1888 – 21 December 1937) was the ruling Maharaja of the Maratha princely state of Dewas from 1900 to 1937. He succeeded to the gadi of Dewas following the death of his uncle, Raja Krishnajirao II. His tutor and guardian from 1907 was Malcolm Lyall Darling.

The first Maharaja of Dewas, he was granted the title by the British Government on his thirtieth birthday in 1918. The novelist E.M. Forster served as his secretary for a period in 1921. In 1934, Tukojirao fled from the British to Pondicherry in French India, leaving his only son Vikramsinhrao to take charge of the state's affairs. He died in exile in Pondicherry three years later at the age of 48, and was succeeded by Vikramsihnrao, who himself exchanged the throne in 1946 to become Chhatrapati Shahaji II Bhonsle, Maharaja of Kolhapur.

Titles
1888-1900: Shrimant Keshavrao Anandrao Puar
1900-1911: His Highness Kshatriya Kulavatana Sena Sapta Sahasri Senapati Pratinidhi, Raja Shrimant Tukojirao III Puar, Raja of Dewas (Senior)
1911-1918: His Highness Kshatriya Kulavatana Sena Sapta Sahasri Senapati Pratinidhi, Raja Shrimant Sir Tukojirao III Puar, Raja of Dewas (Senior), KCSI
1918-1937: His Highness Kshatriya Kulavatana Sena Sapta Sahasri Senapati Pratinidhi, Maharaja Shrimant Sir Tukojirao III Puar, Maharaja of Dewas (Senior), KCSI

Honours
Delhi Durbar Gold Medal-1903
Delhi Durbar Gold Medal-1911
Knight Commander of the Order of the Star of India (KCSI)-1911
King George V Silver Jubilee Medal-1935

See also
 List of Maratha dynasties and states
 List of Indian princely states
 Krishnajirao III
 Tukojirao IV
 Dhar State

Sources

References

20th-century Indian monarchs
1888 births
1937 deaths
Knights Commander of the Order of the Star of India